The 1967–68 National Hurling League was the 37th season of the National Hurling League.

Division 1

Wexford came into the season as defending champions of the 1966-67 season.

On 16 June 1968, Tipperary won the title following a 6-27 to 4-22 aggregate win over New York in the finals. It was their first league title since 1964-65 and their 12th National League title overall.	

Tipperary's Jimmy Doyle was the Division 1 top scorer with 4-50.

Division 1A table

Group stage

Division 1B table

Group stage

Play-off

Knock-out stage

Semi-finals

Home final

Finals

Scoring statistics

Top scorers overall

Top scorers in a single game

Division 2

Kerry came into the season as defending champions of the 1966-67 season.

On 26 May 1968, Kerry won the title following a 2-11 to 1-9 win over Antrim in the finals. It was their fourth Division 2 title overall and their second league title in succession.

Knock-out stage

Semi-finals

Final

Division 3

Louth came into the season as defending champions of the 1966-67 season.

On 5 May 1968, Louth won the title after a 2-2 to 1-2 win over Donegal in the final. It was their second league title overall and their second in succession.

Division 3A table

Division 3B table

Knock-out stage

Final

References

National Hurling League seasons
Lea
Lea